Minuscule 567 (in the Gregory-Aland numbering), α 363 (Soden), also known as the Empress Theodora's Codex is a Greek minuscule manuscript of the New Testament, on parchment, dated palaeographically to the 13th century. The manuscript is very lacunose. Formerly it was labelled by 120a and 141p.

Description
The codex contains the text of Acts of the Apostles, Pauline epistles on 243 parchment leaves (size ) with numerous lacunae. Written in one column per page, 22 lines per page.

The order of books: Acts, Pauline epistles (Philemon, Hebrews), Catholic epistles.

 Lacunae
Acts 1:1-21:20 (Acts 5:38-6:7; 7:6-16; 7:32-10:25 are supplied in a later hand); Acts 28:23-31; Romans 1:1-2:25; 10:17-14:22; 1 Corinthians 6:19-7:12; 8:8-9:19; Ephesians 4:14-25; Philippians 1:6-4:23; Colossians; 1 Thessalonians 1:1-4:1; 5:26-28; 2 Thessalonians 1:1-10; 2 Timothy 2:5-19; Titus 3:2-15; Philemon; James 2:23-3:8; 4:2-14; 5:20-end; 1 John 2:11-3:3; 3:24-5:14; 2 John 11-15; Jude.

Text
The Greek text of the codex Aland did not place in any Category. It has several an unusual readings.

History
The manuscripts was examined and described by Johann Martin Augustin Scholz, Henri Omont.

The codex now is located at the National Library of France (Gr. 103A) at Paris.

See also
 List of New Testament minuscules
 Purple parchment
 Textual criticism

References

Further reading
 

Greek New Testament minuscules
13th-century biblical manuscripts
Bibliothèque nationale de France collections